Gallagher is a surname originating from the Irish noble Gallagher family of Donegal County, Ireland. In Ireland, the anglicized version of the name "Gallagher" is pronounced /ˈɡɒləˌhər/ in County Donegal in Ulster, while elsewhere in the country it is most frequently pronounced as /ˈɡæləˌhər/. Outside Ireland, the pronunciation is often altered to /ˈɡæləˌɡər/ in Britain and the USA. The name Gallagher is an anglicization of the Irish surname Ó Gallchobhair, Ó Gallchobhoir (or two alternative spelling forms, Ó Gallchóir and Ó Gallachóir), these being masculine forms; the corresponding feminine forms are Ní Ghallchobhair (newer forms Ní Ghallchóir and Ní Ghallachóir). At least 30 recorded alternate variants exist, including O'Gallagher, Gallacher, Gallager, Gallaher, Gallocher, Galliher, Gollaher, and Gallahue.

The earliest recorded incidence of the name is in a fragment of a manuscript currently in the Royal Library of Brussels, which states the name "Gallchubhair". A similarly earlier mention occurs in the Annals of the Four Masters, where it is recorded that Mael Cobo Úi Gallchobhar, Abbot of Scrin Adamnain, died in 1022 AD. Gallchobhar was the one given the role of founding father of the clan at the advent of widespread surname usage in Ireland, which began around the 10th century.

As with other modern Irish last names, Ó Gallchóir similarly appears to be a conjoined compound word.

Most Gallaghers are found in the Americas, where approximately 60% of Gallaghers originate. The United States is the home to 55% of Gallaghers. Gallagher is also the most common surname in Donegal County (Dún na nGall means "fort of the foreigner"), and thus is very common in Derry, and is the fourteenth-most-common by birth records in Ireland. In the United States, it was ranked by the 2020 US Census as the 482nd most common name.  According to Professor Edward MacLysaght, in the mid-20th century Gallagher was one of the most common Irish surnames, most of the recorded births being located in the northern province, Ulster, and the western province, Connacht, with the majority being recorded in the homeland of the sept—County Donegal in Ulster. In 1890 it was ranked the 12th-most-common surname in Ireland, while in 1996 it was 20th.

People with surname Gallagher

A 
 Aidan Gallagher, American actor
 Alexandra Gallagher, British multidisciplinary artist
 Ann Gallagher, politician who served in Seanad Éireann
 Audrey Gallagher, trance singer

B 
 Benny Gallagher, Scottish singer/songwriter and member of Gallagher and Lyle
 Bill Gallagher Sr., a New Zealand inventor of the electric fence, founder of Gallagher Group (NZ)
 Bob Gallagher, several people
 Brendan Gallagher, Canadian hockey player
 Bridie Gallagher, singer
 Bronagh Gallagher, Irish singer and actress

C 
 Cam Gallagher American baseball player
 Catherine Gallagher, literary critic
 Charlie Gallagher, several people
 Colm Gallagher, Irish politician
 Conor Gallagher, English football player
 Conrad Gallagher, chef and businessman from Letterkenny
 Cornelius Edward Gallagher, American politician
 Cynthia Gallagher, American artist

D 
 Dan Gallagher, Canadian TV broadcaster
 David Gallagher, several people named David and Dave
 Deirdre Gallagher, Irish race walker
 Delia Gallagher, TV journalist
 Denis Gallagher, Irish politician
 Dennis J. Gallagher, American politician
 Dermot Gallagher, Irish football referee

E 
 Edward Gallagher, several people named Ed or Edward
 Ellis Gallagher, American artist
 Ellen Gallagher, American artist

F 
 Frank Gallagher, several people
 Fred Gallagher, several people

G 
 Gerald Gallagher, medical doctor and British colonial administrator, of the Phoenix Islands Settlement Scheme
 Gerry Gallagher, American footballer
 Gino Gallagher, chief of staff of the militant revolutionary Irish National Liberation Army

H 
 Helen Gallagher, American actress
 Helen Gallagher, Ziegfeld girl who co-founded Gallagher's Steak House
 Harry Gallagher (1880-1975), Irish businessman and founder of Urney Chocolates
 Hugh Gallagher, several people

J 
 Jack Gallagher, several people
 Jackie Gallagher, male English footballer
 James Gallagher, several people
 Jill Gallagher, Australian aboriginal worker
 Jim Gallagher, several people
 Jimmy Gallagher (1901–1971), Scottish-American soccer player
 Joe Gallagher (baseball) (1914–1998), American baseball player
 Joe Gallagher (boxing)
 Joe Gallagher (footballer)
 John Gallagher, several people
 Joseph Gallagher, Chess opening strategy theorist and one of six living Swiss chess grandmasters

K 
 Kathryn Gallagher, American singer and actress
 Katie Gallagher, fashion designer
 Katie Gallagher, penname of Sarah Addison Allen
 Katy Gallagher, Chief Minister of the Australian Capital Territory
 Kenna Gallagher (1917–2011), British Foreign Office official and diplomat
 Kerri Gallagher (born 1989), American middle-distance runner
 Kevin R. Gallagher, American guitarist
 Kim Gallagher, American track and field Olympian

L 
 Leo Anthony Gallagher Jr., better known under his stage name Gallagher (1946–2022), American comedian
 Liam Gallagher, former lead singer of the British bands Oasis and Beady Eye
 Louis J. Gallagher, American Jesuit, educator, writer and translator

M 
 Maggie Gallagher, American commentator
 Mark Gallagher, guitarist of the British heavy metal band Raven
 Matt Gallagher, several people
 Megan Gallagher, American actress
 Martin Gallagher, New Zealand politician
 Michael Gallagher, several people named Michael or Mike, most notably political scientist Michael Gallagher (academic), creator of the Gallagher index
 Mick Gallagher, musician with Ian Dury and the Blockheads

N 
 Neil Gallagher, several people
 Noel Gallagher, former lead guitarist of Oasis and currently with Noel Gallagher's High Flying Birds
 Norm Gallagher, Australian trade unionist

P 
 PJ Gallagher, several people
 Pat Gallagher, several people named Pat or Patricia
 Patrick Gallagher, several people named Paddy or Patrick
 Paul Gallagher, several people
 Peta Gallagher, Australian field hockey player
 Peter Gallagher, several people

R 
 Raymond F. Gallagher (born 1939), New York state senator
 Richard B. Gallagher, Scottish academic publisher
 Richard F. Gallagher, American college basketball coach
 Richard "Skeets" Gallagher
 Robert Gallagher, magazine photographer
 Rory Gallagher, Irish blues guitarist and singer

S 
 Sean Gallagher, several people
 Shane Gallagher, guitarist with bands +44 and Mercy Killers
 Shaun Gallagher, American philosopher
 Stephen Gallagher, British author and screenwriter

T 
 Teresa Gallagher, British actress
 Tess Gallagher, American author
 Thomas Gallagher, several people named Thomas, Tom and Tommy
 Tim Gallagher, American ornithologist
 Tony Gallagher (businessman) (born 1951), British billionaire property developer
 Trace Gallagher, Fox News anchor

W 
 Wes Gallagher, American journalist and general manager of the Associated Press
 William Gallagher, several people

Fictional Characters 
Gallagher Family (Shameless)

See also 

 Gallagher family, the ancestral Irish clan

References 



Anglicised Irish-language surnames
Surnames of Irish origin